Villawood East Public School is a public, primary day school situated in the southwestern Sydney suburb of Villawood, New South Wales, Australia with an average enrollment of 280 students. It was established in 1955 and in 1999 was awarded The Director-General's School Achievement Award for Programs to Support Students. Their statement of purpose is "Quality Learning through Participation and Equity".

References

External links 
 

Public primary schools in Sydney